is a 2021 Japanese romantic drama anthology film written and directed by Ryusuke Hamaguchi. The film stars Kotone Furukawa, Katsuki Mori, and Fusako Urabe as the lead actresses of each of the anthology's three segments.

The film was previewed online and in cinemas in four cities across the world to buyers, the press, and the festival juries in the Competition of the 71st Berlin International Film Festival from March 1–5, 2021, after which it was awarded the Silver Bear Grand Jury Prize. It had its public world premiere at the 22nd Buenos Aires International Independent Film Festival on March 23.

It was first released nationally in cinemas in Denmark, on July 29, 2021. It was not released across Japan until December 17 the same year.

Plot

Episode 1: "Magic (or Something Less Assuring)"
During a taxi ride back from a photo shoot, model Meiko hears about her best friend Tsugumi's new love interest. After Tsugumi is dropped off, Meiko takes the taxi back to an office, where she confronts her ex-boyfriend, Kazuaki, who she gathered is the same person Tsugumi was talking about. She relates things Tsugumi told her, including that Kazuaki could not get over his ex-girlfriend. After arguing, he hugs her, and Meiko runs away.

While Meiko and Tsugumi are at a cafe, they see Kazuaki outside and Tsugumi beckons him inside, insisting that Meiko stay to give her opinion on him. Meiko immediately demands that Kazuaki choose between them, resulting in Tsugumi running away and Kazuaki chasing after her, but this is quickly revealed to be a fantasy. Instead, Meiko excuses herself, and Kazuaki plans to take Tsugumi someplace after the cafe.

Episode 2: "Door Wide Open"
A professor's class is interrupted by a student loudly begging and prostrating himself before another professor, asking him not to fail him, as it would derail his future as a news anchor. The professor, French instructor Segawa, only responds unsympathetically. The student, Sasaki, is later at his apartment with his friend-with-benefits, married mother Nao, and learns from the news that Segawa has won the prestigious Akutagawa Prize for a novel he has written. Sasaki coerces Nao into seducing the professor in order to create a scandal.

Nao enters the professor's office, introducing herself as his former student, closing the door behind her, but the professor insists that it stay open. She gets his autograph and requests if she can ask him questions about the novel. She reads aloud an erotic passage about a character getting his testicles sucked and ejaculating. The two have a heart-to-heart conversation. Nao reveals that she was recording the professor the entire time, and he requests that she send him the audio. She agrees but only after making a request that he "touch himself" while listening to the recording of her voice, and he verbally agrees to do this. Once home, Nao accidentally sends the email to "Sagawa" at the university, having misstyped the name. 

The misspelling of a single letter in the name directs the recording to another person at the university who is an administrator. Segawa's reputation is ruined when the audio file becomes public, and Nao's husband divorces her. Years later, Nao runs into an estranged Sasaki on the bus. She is working as a proofreader, and him, an editor, with both leading separate lives. Sasaki does not show any remorse for ruining Segawa, and Nao grows annoyed by his talking. She appears to experience some remorse in recalling the 'recording' affair and its outcome. Sasaki mentions that he is getting married. As Nao reaches her stop, she gives Sasaki her business card and kisses him as she steps off the bus.

Episode 3: "Once Again"
In 2019, a virus resulted in computers inadvertently divulging their data, resulting in everyone reverting to using telegrams and the postal service. Natsuko attends her all-girls high school reunion, finding that she does not fit in nor remember her classmates' names. Later at the train station, she recognizes a classmate she was close with and is invited to her home. The two reminisce, and Natsuko asks her if she is truly happy. Realizing that Natsuko is about to let heavy feelings off her chest, the classmate admits that she has forgotten Natsuko's name. The two learn that they've mistaken each other for former classmates, not even having attended the same school.

An embarrassed Natsuko tries to make excuses and depart but is convinced to stay. Natsuko reveals that the person she mistook the lady, Aya, for was her first love and that the two of them broke up in college. Aya offers to role-play as her ex-girlfriend from 20 years ago, helping Natsuko to vent her many unresolved feelings for her old college friend. As they eventually return to the train station, Natsuko learns that Aya mistook her for a classmate she used to play the piano with, and Natsuko role-plays as her in turn. The role-playing now helps Aya to resolve past feelings which she had not been able to previously resolve. As they eventually part, Aya  changes her mind and runs back to catch up with Natsuko before she gets on her train back to Tokyo. She tells her that she has finally remembered her old classmate's first name which had eluded her for the last several hours. The two hug each other recognizing that they have each been able to at least partially resolve past issues which they had previously thought had passed as unresolved with the passage of time.

Cast
The cast includes:
Kotone Furukawa as Meiko
Ayumu Nakajima as Kazuaki Kubota
Hyunri as Tsugumi Konno
Kiyohiko Shibukawa as Segawa
Katsuki Mori as Nao
Shouma Kai as Sasaki
Fusako Urabe as Moka Natsuko
Aoba Kawai as Nana Aya

Release
On February 11, 2021, the Berlin International Film Festival announced that the film had been selected to have its worldwide premiere in the Competition of the 71st festival. Due to cinemas in Berlin being closed due to the level of COVID-19 infections, the film did not have its world public premiere in Berlin but was instead previewed online and in cinemas in four other cities across the world to buyers, the press, and the festival juries from March 1–5, 2021. It was also selected for the Gala Presentation section of the 26th Busan International Film Festival and screened there on October 7, 2021.

It was released in both physical and virtual cinemas in the United States and Canada from October 15, 2021, by Film Movement.

It was released in physical and virtual cinemas in the United Kingdom and Ireland on February 11, 2022, by Modern Films.

Reception
Rotten Tomatoes reported that 99% of critics have given the film a positive review based on 108 reviews, with an average rating of 8.4/10. The site's critics consensus reads "Writer-director Ryūsuke Hamaguchi explores multiple facets of the human condition with Wheel of Fortune and Fantasy, all to delightfully affecting effect." On Metacritic, the film has an assigned score of 86 out of 100, based on 19 critic reviews, denoting "universal acclaim".

Wheel of Fortune and Fantasy was ranked fifth on Cahiers du Cinémas top 10 films of 2022 list. The film was also named one of Jonathan Rosenbaum's "Best Films of 2022".

Awards and nominations

References

External links
 at M-Appeal
 at Film Movement
 at Modern Films

2021 LGBT-related films
2021 romantic drama films
Japanese anthology films
Japanese romantic drama films
Japanese LGBT-related films
LGBT-related romantic drama films
Silver Bear Grand Jury Prize winners
Films directed by Ryusuke Hamaguchi